State Route 173 (SR 173) is located in northeastern Ohio, and runs east–west from State Route 44, about  north of Louisville, Ohio to State Route 14 and State Route 9 in downtown Salem, Ohio. It primarily passes through Stark and Columbiana counties, though it also straddles the county line between Mahoning County and Columbiana County for some of its length. Much of the route is also run in concurrency with U.S. Route 62.

History
SR 173 was commissioned in 1923, originally routed from SR 19. northeast of Louisville, to SR 19, south of Beloit. In 1927 the route was rerouted onto the route of previous SR 19, through Alliance. The route was extended west to its current western terminus, at SR 44, in 1937. Between 1969 and 1971, SR 173 was rerouted concurrent with US 62 from west of Alliance to Salem. In 1976 US 62 in Salem was rerouted to bypass the city and SR 173 remained on the old route of US 62.

Major intersections

References

173
Transportation in Stark County, Ohio
Transportation in Mahoning County, Ohio
Transportation in Columbiana County, Ohio